Réal is a commune in the Pyrénées-Orientales department in southern France.

Geography 
Réal is in the canton of Les Pyrénées catalanes and in the arrondissement of Prades.

Population

Sites of interest 
 The Saint-Romain church, built between the 11th and 17th centuries.
 The Puyvalador lake.

See also
Communes of the Pyrénées-Orientales department

References

Communes of Pyrénées-Orientales